John Evans Kwadwo Bosompem (1940–2002) also professionally known Santo or Bob Santo was a Ghanaian comedian and actor. He featured in movies speaking Akan. He usually acted with his close compatriot, Judas.

Career
Santo had a decade of fame in the early 1990s to 2000's with his friend Judas in movie production, acting and theater. He was the leader of the Omintiminim Concert Party in 1995 when he and his friend Abusapanyin Judas went into film acting and concert party performance.

Filmography
419
Abawa Mary
Banker to Banker
Double Sense
Asem
Efiewura
Key Soap Concert Party
Landlord
Marijata (1, 2 and 3)
Okukuseku (1, 2 and 3)
Sika
That Day
Hard Times
Lucifer

Death 
Santo suffered and died on 30 May 2002 from a disease known as jaundice. He was 67 and was survived by two wives and three children.

References

External links 

1940 births
2002 deaths
Ghanaian comedians
Ghanaian male stage actors
Comedians by nationality